Guy Edmonds is an Australian born director, writer, actor and author. He co-created, wrote, acted in and directed the Emmy award-winning comedy series  Hardball. He co-authored the hit book series Zombie Diaries and Zoo Crew. As an actor he is best known for his work on such programmes as Home and Away, A Moody Christmas and Underbelly: Razor, and on stage in the world premiere productions of Holding the Man as Timothy Conigrave in Australia and London's West End, and Rupert alongside Academy Award nominee James Cromwell in Australia and Washington D.C, USA.

Biography

Guy co-created/wrote the Emmy award-winning live action comedy series HARDBALL for Australia's ABCMe. Season Two's out mid 2021, which he's written and directed. It also won Best Children's Fiction Program at the Prix Jeunesse International Awards, the BANFF Rockies, The Remis, The Japan Prize, and others, as well as being nominated for the AWGIES and AACTA's in Australia. HARDBALL can be seen on CBBC (UK), France Televisions (France), NRK (Norway), RTE (Ireland), TVO (Canada), TVB (Hong Kong), RTP (Portugal), SABC (South Africa) and more.

His next series DANCE SPIES, which he's created and written, is being co-produced by Sinking Ship in Canada and Northern Pictures in Australia

He has two kids books trilogies releasing between 2021 & 2023, ZOMBIE DIARIES and ZOO CREW, has made a number of internationally award-winning short films, and was a directing finalist at the prestigious Tropfest Film Festival. He's also written and directed the National Institute of Dramatic Art's Graduating Actor's Film Scenes since 2017. As an actor, he has over 50 credits on both stage and screen, including HOLDING THE MAN, UNDERBELLY: RAZOR, HARDBALL, A MOODY CHRISTMAS, HOME AND AWAY and THE SECRETS SHE KEEPS to name a few.

Guy is represented in Sydney, Los Angeles and London.

Film credits
Tumblegum
It's A Treat
J.B and the Mule
Bedlam
Red Dot
Almost
Invasion
Rapid Fear

TV credits
A Moody Christmas
Underbelly: Razor
Home and Away
The Unlikely Planet
Darren
Double Take
Hammer Bay
All Saints
The Code (Series 2)

Theatre credits
The Lover
Holding the Man (London West End Season)
Orestes 2.0
Fortune and Men's Eyes
pool (no water)
Toy Symphony (World Premiere)
Holding the Man (World Premiere)
The Cold Child
Rupert

Musical theatre credits
It's About Time (World Premiere in London)

References

External links 

Australian male television actors
Australian male stage actors
Living people
People from Queensland
Year of birth missing (living people)
Queensland University of Technology alumni